The fourth wall is a performance convention in which an invisible, imaginary wall separates actors from the audience. While the audience can see through this "wall", the convention assumes the actors act as if they cannot. From the 16th century onward, the rise of illusionism in staging practices, which culminated in the realism and naturalism of the theatre of the 19th century, led to the development of the fourth wall concept.

The metaphor suggests a relationship to the mise-en-scène behind a proscenium arch. When a scene is set indoors and three of the walls of its room are presented onstage, in what is known as a box set, the fourth of them would run along the line (technically called the proscenium) dividing the room from the auditorium. The fourth wall, though, is a theatrical convention, rather than of set design. The actors ignore the audience, focus their attention exclusively on the dramatic world, and remain absorbed in its fiction, in a state that the theatre practitioner Konstantin Stanislavski called "public solitude" (the ability to behave as one would in private, despite, in actuality, being watched intently while so doing, or to be 'alone in public'). In this way, the fourth wall exists regardless of the presence of any actual walls in the set, the physical arrangement of the theatre building or performance space, or the actors' distance from or proximity to the audience. In practice, performers often feed off the energy of the audience in a palpable way while modulating performance around the collective response, especially in pacing action around outbursts of laughter, so that lines are not delivered inaudibly.

Breaking the fourth wall is violating this performance convention, which has been adopted more generally in the drama. This can be done by either directly referring to the audience, the play as a play, or the characters' fictionality. The temporary suspension of the convention in this way draws attention to its use in the rest of the performance. This act of drawing attention to a play's performance conventions is metatheatrical. A similar effect of metareference is achieved when the performance convention of avoiding direct contact with the camera, generally used by actors in a television drama or film, is temporarily suspended. The phrase "breaking the fourth wall" is used to describe such effects in those media. Breaking the fourth wall is also possible in other media, such as video games and books.

History of the convention
The concept is usually attributed to the philosopher, critic and dramatist Denis Diderot in 1758.

 
The acceptance of the transparency of the fourth wall is part of the suspension of disbelief between a work of fiction and an audience, allowing them to enjoy the fiction as though they were observing real events. Critic Vincent Canby described it in 1987 as "that invisible scrim that forever separates the audience from the stage".

In theatre
The fourth wall did not exist as a concept for much of dramatic history. Classical plays from Ancient Greece to the Renaissance have frequent direct addresses to the audience such as asides and soliloquies.

The presence of the fourth wall is an established convention of modern realistic theatre, which has led some artists to draw direct attention to it for dramatic or comic effect when a boundary is "broken" when an actor or character addresses the audience directly. Breaking the fourth wall is common in pantomime and children's theatre where, for example, a character might ask the children for help, as when Peter Pan appeals to the audience to applaud in an effort to revive the fading Tinker Bell ("If you believe in fairies, clap your hands!"). Many of Shakespeare's plays use this technique for comic effect.

In cinema
 One of the earliest recorded breakings of the fourth wall in serious cinema was in Mary MacLane's 1918 silent film Men Who Have Made Love to Me, in which the enigmatic authoress – who portrays herself – interrupts the vignettes onscreen to address the audience directly.

Oliver Hardy often broke the fourth wall in his films with Stan Laurel, when he would stare directly at the camera to seek sympathy from viewers. Groucho Marx spoke directly to the audience in Animal Crackers (1930), and Horse Feathers (1932), in the latter film advising them to "go out to the lobby" during Chico Marx's piano interlude. Comedy films by Mel Brooks, Monty Python, and Zucker, Abrahams, and Zucker frequently broke the fourth wall, such that with these films "the fourth wall is so flimsy and so frequently shattered that it might as well not exist", according to The A.V. Club.

Woody Allen broke the fourth wall repeatedly in his movie Annie Hall (1977), as he explained, "because I felt many of the people in the audience had the same feelings and the same problems. I wanted to talk to them directly and confront them." His 1985 film The Purple Rose of Cairo features the breaking of the fourth wall as a central plot point.

The fourth wall was used as an integral part of the plot structure and to demonstrate the character played by Michael Caine, in his eponymous breakout role in the 1966 film Alfie, who frequently spoke to the audience to explain the thinking and motivation of the womanizing young man, speaking directly to the camera, narrating and justifying his actions, his words often contrasting with his actions.

Jerry Lewis wrote in his 1971 book The Total Filmmaker, "Some film-makers believe you should never have an actor look directly into the camera. They maintain it makes the audience uneasy, and interrupts the screen story. I think that is nonsense, and usually I have my actors, in a single, look direct into the camera at least once in a film, if a point is to be served." Martin and Lewis look directly at the audience in You're Never Too Young (1955), and Lewis and co-star Stella Stevens each look directly into the camera several times in The Nutty Professor (1963), and Lewis' character holds a pantomime conversation with the audience in The Disorderly Orderly (1964). The final scene of The Patsy (1964) is famous for revealing to the audience the movie as a movie, and Lewis as actor/director.

In the 1986 teen film, Ferris Bueller's Day Off, the titular character breaks the fourth wall to talk directly to the audience.

Mike Myers broke the fourth wall in The Love Guru when he looked directly at the camera for a split-second when a Queen song came on as a reference to the famous Wayne's World head-banging scene. Eddie Murphy makes two brief, wordless glances at the camera in Trading Places. Near the end of Nobody's Fool, Tiffany Haddish breaks the fourth wall by declaring that the film is not over and then proceeding to ruin a wedding ceremony.

In The Railway Children the entire cast breaks the fourth wall and performs a curtain call as the credits roll. The camera moves slowly along a railway track towards a train that is decked in flags, in front of which all of the cast is assembled, waving and cheering to the camera. At the start of the credit sequence, a voice can be heard shouting "Thank you, Mr. Forbes" to acknowledge producer Bryan Forbes. In the end, Bobbie Waterbury (Jenny Agutter) holds up a small slate on which "The End" is written in chalk.

In Mr. Bean's Holiday the entire cast, together with massed extras, break the fourth wall while joining in singing "La Mer" by Charles Trenet, accompanied by a recording by the song's writer.

Leonardo DiCaprio repeatedly breaks the fourth wall in the 2013 film The Wolf of Wall Street directed by Martin Scorsese.

The movies Deadpool and Deadpool 2 are specifically known for the main character Deadpool, played by Ryan Reynolds, consistently breaking the fourth wall.

In Star Trek, Star Trek VI: The Undiscovered Country, the last movie depicting the original cast, ends with the cast looking and smiling at the camera, breaking the fourth wall.

Funny Games has Paul and Peter repeatedly breaking the fourth wall by turning around and winking at the camera, talking to the audience by saying they are probably rooting for the family, addressing the film isn't at its feature runtime and smiling at the camera at the end of the film.

The 2022 Persuasion film was criticized for its modernization take on the classic 1817 Jane Austen novel by having the main protagonist Anne Elliot (played by Dakota Johnson) constantly breaking the fourth wall by interacting with the audience.

On television

On television, breaking the fourth wall has been done throughout the history of the medium.

Fourth wall breakage is common in comedy-based programs, used frequently by Bugs Bunny and other characters in Looney Tunes and other later animated shows, as well as the live-action sketch comedy of Monty Python's Flying Circus, which the troupe also brought to their feature films. George Burns regularly broke the fourth wall on The George Burns and Gracie Allen Show (1950). The Marvel television series, She-Hulk: Attorney at Law, has its center character, Jennifer Walters/She-Hulk, frequently use fourth-wall breaking as part of its comedy, and on its finale episode, literally broke the fourth wall by "breaking out" of the Disney+ app, take to the real Marvel Studios, and demand changes from the robot K.E.V.I.N., an in-joke for the Marvel Studios head Kevin Feige.

Another convention of breaking the fourth wall is often seen on mockumentary sitcoms, including The Office. Mockumentary shows that break the fourth wall poke fun at the documentary genre with the intention of increasing the satiric tone of the show. Characters in The Office directly speak to the audience during interview sequences. Characters are removed from the rest of the group to speak and reflect on their experiences. The person behind the camera, the interviewer, is also referenced when the characters gaze and speak straight to the camera. The interviewer, however, is only indirectly spoken to and remains hidden. This technique, when used in shows with complex genres, serves to heighten the comic tone of the show while also proving that the camera itself is far from a passive onlooker.

In the sitcom How I Met Your Mother, the fourth wall gets broken by Robin Scherbatsky in the episode "Mystery vs. History".

Another approach to breaking the fourth wall is through a central narrator character who is part of the show's events, but at times speaks directly to the audience. For example, Francis Urquhart in the British TV drama series House of Cards, To Play the King and The Final Cut addresses the audience several times during each episode, giving the viewer comments on his own actions on the show. The same technique is also used, though less frequently, in the American adaptation of House of Cards by main character Frank Underwood.
The Netflix series A Series of Unfortunate Events, based on Daniel Handler's book series of the same name, incorporates some of the narrative elements from the books by having Lemony Snicket as a narrator character (played by Patrick Warburton) speaking directly to the television viewer that frequently breaks the fourth wall to explain various literary wordplay in a manner similar to the book's narration. The protagonist of Fleabag also uses frequently the technique to provide exposition, internal monologues, and a running commentary to the audience.

Every episode of the sitcom Saved by the Bell breaks the fourth wall with an introduction by the character Zack Morris. Most episodes have several other fourth wall breaks. This is similar to how The Fresh Prince of Bel-Air, Clarissa Explains It All and Malcolm in the Middle use fourth wall breaks to set up stories or have characters comment on situations.

Furthermore, breaking the fourth wall can also be used in meta-referencing in order to draw attention to or invite reflection about a specific in-universe issue. An example of this is in the very first episode of the final season of the show Attack on Titan, where a newly introduced character, Falco Grice, starts to hallucinate about events that took place in the last 3 seasons. This literary device utilises self-referencing to trigger media-awareness in the recipient, used to signpost the drastic shift in perspective from the Eldian to the Marleyan side, and can be employed in all sorts of media.

The use of breaking the fourth wall in television has sometimes been unintentional. In the Doctor Who episode "The Caves of Androzani", the character of Morgus frequently breaks the fourth wall when he is alone in his office. This was due to actor John Normington misunderstanding a stage direction. But the episode's director, Graeme Harper, felt that this helped increase dramatic tension, and decided not to reshoot the scenes.

In video games
Given their interactive nature, nearly all video games break the fourth wall by asking for the player's participation. But beyond the obvious ways in which video games break the fourth wall (for example, by having User Interface (UI) elements on the screen, teaching the player controls, teaching the player how to save, etc.), there are several other ways that games have done this. These can include having the character face the direction of the player/screen, having a self-aware character that recognizes that they are in a video game, or having secret or bonus content set outside the game's narrative that can either extend the game world (such as with the use of false documents) or provide "behind the scenes" type content. Such cases typically create a video game that includes a metafiction narrative, commonly presently characters in the game incorporating knowledge they are in a video game.

For example, in Doki Doki Literature Club!, one of the characters (Monika) is aware she is part of a video game, and at times, asks the player to delete game files that are the other in-game characters via their computer's operating system (an action they take outside of the game) to progress the story. The plot of the game OneShot revolves around the fictional universe of the game being a simulation running on the player's computer, with certain characters being aware of this fact and sometimes communicating directly with the player. In other cases of metafictional video games, the game alters the player's expectation of how the game should behave, which may make the player question if their own game system is at fault, helping to increase the immersion of the game.

But since video games are inherently much more interactive than traditional films and literature, defining what truly breaks the fourth wall in the video game medium becomes difficult.  Steven Conway, writing for Gamasutra, suggests that in video games, many purported examples of breaking the fourth wall are actually better understood as relocations of the fourth wall or expansions of the "magic circle" (the fictional game world) to encompass the player. This is in contrast to traditional fourth wall breaks, which break the audience's illusion or suspension of disbelief, by acknowledging them directly. Conway argues that this expansion of the magic circle in video games actually serves to more fully immerse a player into the fictional world rather than take the viewer out of the fictional world, as is more common in traditional fourth wall breaks. An example of this expansion of the magic circle can be found in the game Evidence: The Last Ritual, in which the player receives an in-game email at their real-life email address and must visit out-of-game websites to solve some of the puzzles in the game. Other games may expand the magic circle to include the game's hardware. For example, X-Men for the Mega Drive/Genesis requires players to reset their game console at a certain point to reset the X-Men's in-game Hazard Room, while Metal Gear Solid asks the player to put the DualShock controller on their neck to simulate a back massage being given in-game.

Other examples include the idle animation of Sonic the Hedgehog in his games where the on-screen character would look to the player and tap his foot impatiently if left alone for a while, and one level of Max Payne has the eponymous character come to the realization he and other characters are in a video game and narrates what the player sees as part of the UI. Eternal Darkness, which included a sanity meter, would simulate various common computer glitches to the player as the sanity meter drained, including the Blue Screen of Death. The Stanley Parable is also a well-known example of this, as the narrator from the game constantly tries to reason with the player, even going so far as to beg the player to switch off the game at one point.

In literature 

The method of breaking the fourth wall in literature is a metalepsis (the transgression of narrative levels), which is a technique often used in metafiction. The metafiction genre occurs when a character within a literary work acknowledges the reality that they are in fact a fictitious being. The use of the fourth wall in literature can be traced back as far as The Canterbury Tales and Don Quixote. Northanger Abbey is a late modern era example. However, it was popularized in the early 20th century during the Post-Modern literary movement. Artists like Virginia Woolf in To the Lighthouse and Kurt Vonnegut in Breakfast of Champions used the genre to question the accepted knowledge and sources of the culture. The use of metafiction or breaking the fourth wall in literature varies from that on stage in that the experience is not communal but personal to the reader and develops a self-consciousness within the character/reader relationship that works to build trust and expand thought. This does not involve an acknowledgment of a character's fictive nature. Breaking the fourth wall in literature is not always metafiction. Modern examples of breaking the fourth wall include Ada Palmer's Terra Ignota, and William Goldman's The Princess Bride. Sorj Chalandon wrote a novel called "The 4th wall" of the setting-up of a theatrical performance of Antigone in Beirut, while the civil war is raging.

See also
 Aside
 Audience participation
 List of narrative techniques
 Meta-reference

References

External links
List of films that break the fourth wall on the Art and Popular Culture Encyclopedia

Metafictional techniques
Stage terminology